19th Street may refer to:

 19th Street (IRT Second Avenue Line), a defunct New York City Subway station
 19th Street station (DC Streetcar), a light rail stop in Washington, D.C.
 19th Street station (H&M), a defunct Hudson and Manhattan Railroad (PATH) station 
 19th Street station (SEPTA), a subway station in Philadelphia, Pennsylvania
 19th Street Oakland station, an underground Bay Area Rapid Transit station located in Downtown Oakland, California

See also
 19th Street Bridge, truss bridge in Denver, Colorado